Chinese Taipei competed at the 2012 Summer Olympics in London, from 27 July to 12 August 2012. "Chinese Taipei" was the designated name used by Taiwan to participate in some international organizations and almost all sporting events, including the Olympic Games.  Neither the common name "Taiwan" nor the official name "Republic of China" would be used due primarily to opposition from the People's Republic of China. This was the nation's eighth consecutive appearance at the Olympics.

With the absence of baseball and softball at the Olympics, the Chinese Taipei Olympic Committee sent the nation's smallest delegation to the Games since 1992. A total of 44 athletes, 19 men and 25 women, competed in 14 sports. For the second time in its Olympic history, Chinese Taipei was represented by more female than male athletes. There was only a single competitor in fencing, judo, rowing, and sailing. This was also the youngest delegation in Chinese Taipei's Olympic history, with more than half under the age of 25, and many of them were expected to reach their peak in time for the 2016 Summer Olympics in Rio de Janeiro. Fourteen athletes had competed in Beijing, including taekwondo jin and fourth-placer Yang Shu-Chun. Four Chinese Taipei athletes made their third consecutive Olympic appearance: table tennis players Chuang Chih-Yuan and Huang Yi-Hua, and badminton players Cheng Wen-Hsing and Chien Yu-Chin in the women's doubles. Weightlifter Chen Shih-chieh, who competed at his first Olympics, was the nation's flag bearer at the opening ceremony.

Chinese Taipei left London with two medals: a gold and a bronze, the lowest in Summer Olympic history since 1996. These medals were awarded to the female athletes in weightlifting and taekwondo.

Medalists

Archery

Chinese Taipei has qualified three archers for the men's individual event, a team for the men's team event, three archers for the women's individual event, and a team for the women's team event

Men

Women

Athletics

Athletes from Chinese Taipei have so far achieved qualifying standards in the following athletics events (up to a maximum of 3 athletes in each event at the 'A' Standard, and 1 at the 'B' Standard):

Men
Track & road events

Field events

Women
Field events

Badminton

Men

Women

Mixed

Cycling

Road

Track
Omnium

Fencing

Women

Judo

Chinese Taipei has qualified 1 judoka

Rowing

Chinese Taipei has qualified the following boats.

Men

Qualification Legend: FA=Final A (medal); FB=Final B (non-medal); FC=Final C (non-medal); FD=Final D (non-medal); FE=Final E (non-medal); FF=Final F (non-medal); SA/B=Semifinals A/B; SC/D=Semifinals C/D; SE/F=Semifinals E/F; QF=Quarterfinals; R=Repechage

Sailing

Chinese Taipei has qualified 1 boat for each of the following events

Men

M = Medal race; EL = Eliminated – did not advance into the medal race;

Shooting

Chinese Taipei has ensured berths in the following shooting events: 	

Women

Swimming

Swimmers from Chinese Taipei have so far achieved qualifying standards in the following events (up to a maximum of 2 swimmers in each event at the Olympic Qualifying Time (OQT), and potentially 1 at the Olympic Selection Time (OST)):

Men

Women

Table tennis 

Chinese Taipei has qualified a man and two women in table tennis.

Taekwondo 

Chinese Taipei has ensured berths in the following events of taekwondo by reaching the top 3 of the 2011 WTF World Qualification Tournament or the Asian Qualification Tournament:

Tennis

Weightlifting

Chinese Taipei has qualified 1 man and 3 women.

References

Summer Olympics
Nations at the 2012 Summer Olympics
2012